Glenn Patrick Sherlock (born September 26, 1960) American professional baseball coach. He is currently a coach for the New York Mets. He previously was a coach for the Pittsburgh Pirates, and one of the original coaches for the Arizona Diamondbacks, serving for 19 consecutive seasons (1998–2016). He was the team's longtime bullpen coach, although he spent stints as bench coach, first base coach and third base coach (2004; 2014).

Playing career
Sherlock attended Rollins College, and in 1981 and 1982 he played collegiate summer baseball with the Yarmouth-Dennis Red Sox of the Cape Cod Baseball League. He was originally signed by the Houston Astros as their 21st pick in the 1983 MLB Draft.

Coaching and managerial career
He managed the Rookie-level Gulf Coast Yankees  (1990; 1993) and led the Class A Fort Lauderdale Yankees in 1991, when he was named a coach for the Florida State League All-Star Game. His three-year minor league managerial record wrapped up at 121-128 (.486) and then he went down under to hone his managerial skills in the winter of 1993, leading the Canberra Bushrangers in the Australian Baseball League.
 
Sherlock was catching instructor for the Yankees twice, working in the bullpen in 1992, then once again in 1994 and 1995. He was employed for ten seasons in the Yankee chain either as a minor league player, coach or manager.

Brought to the Diamondbacks in 1996 as a minor league instructor by Buck Showalter, the team's first manager and also a veteran of the Yankee farm system, Sherlock worked for eight different managers in his 19 seasons on the Diamondbacks' MLB staff. On November 15, 2016, it was announced that Sherlock would replace Tim Teufel as the Mets' new third base coach and a catching instructor.

Sherlock joined the Pittsburgh Pirates as a coach prior to the 2020 season.

Sherlock was named bench coach for the New York Mets on January 15, 2022. After the 2022 season, it was announced that Eric Chavez would take over as bench coach while Sherlock would become a Major League catching coach.

References

External links

Mets reassign base coach Tim Teufel, hire Glenn Sherlock as replacement

1960 births
Living people
Asheville Tourists players
Albany-Colonie Yankees players
Arizona Diamondbacks coaches
Auburn Astros players
Baseball coaches from Massachusetts
Baseball players from Massachusetts
Columbus Clippers players
Fort Lauderdale Yankees managers
Major League Baseball bench coaches
Major League Baseball bullpen catchers
Major League Baseball bullpen coaches
Major League Baseball first base coaches
Major League Baseball third base coaches
New York Mets coaches
New York Yankees coaches
Osceola Astros players
People from Nahant, Massachusetts
Pittsburgh Pirates coaches
Yarmouth–Dennis Red Sox players
Sportspeople from Essex County, Massachusetts